"Beautiful Encounter (Yan Yu)" is a song by Taiwanese recording artist Elva Hsiao, taken from her tenth studio album, Diamond Candy, released by EMI.

Song information
Composed by Michael Jay and Johnny Pedersen, the song was released to radio stations of Taiwan as a promotional single from the album Diamond Candy in 2010, shortly after the release of the fifth single, "WOW" to maintain good sales of her album while preparing the next album, Miss Elva.

Chart performance

Charts

Wanessa version

In 2010, Brazilian pop singer Wanessa covered the song, with the title "Worth It", for her EP, Você não Perde por Esperar. The song leaked on the Internet on September 3, being officially released on September 9, 2010.

Music video
The video for "Worth It" shows Wanessa, accompanied by dancers, dancing to music. The singer and the dancers wear several different outfits throughout the video, alternating between the colors black, white and red, as well as the backdrop. Special effects simulating sprayed ink are included in some scenes. The video was released on the singer's account on YouTube, on November 16, 2011 and it was directed by Luis Fiod and creative director of photography, Henry Gendre.

Critical reception
The video received mixed reviews. The editors of the site Vírgula, from UOL said: "Wanessa continues strong in its goal of becoming the great diva of the Brazilian LGBT. Her new video, Worth It brings a lot of energy choreography and "banging" of hair. For those who do not know, "Ram-hair" is the nickname given to the type of house with female vocal pop ballads popular gay. Accompanied by eight dancers and colorful special effects, the video has everything to consecrate Wanessa in various segments of the public."

Already the site has made three three Chick criticism, saying that "Wanessa, the "American singer from Brazil". (...) Truth be told, she has done things properly, all well produced. But still lack a bit of salt, right? Music videos, dances, songs too bureaucratic. She needs a little innovation ...".

References

2010 songs
Elva Hsiao songs
Wanessa Camargo songs
2009 songs
EMI Records singles